René Hoch (born 11 April 1978) is a German weightlifter. He competed in the men's middleweight event at the 2004 Summer Olympics.

References

1978 births
Living people
German male weightlifters
Olympic weightlifters of Germany
Weightlifters at the 2004 Summer Olympics
Sportspeople from Berlin